Thomas Parits (born 7 October 1946) is a former international Austrian football player and manager.

Currently, he is working as the sporting director of FK Austria Wien.

References

External links 
 
 Player profile at Austria-Archiv 
 Manager profile at Austria-Archiv 

Austrian footballers
Austria international footballers
FK Austria Wien players
1. FC Köln players
Eintracht Frankfurt players
Granada CF footballers
LASK players
Austrian Football Bundesliga players
Bundesliga players
La Liga players
Austrian football managers
FK Austria Wien managers
FC Admira Wacker Mödling managers
People from Eisenstadt-Umgebung District
1946 births
Living people
Austrian expatriate sportspeople in West Germany
Expatriate footballers in West Germany
Austrian expatriate sportspeople in Spain
Expatriate footballers in Spain
Association football forwards
Footballers from Burgenland
Burgenland Croats